Black Ash Swamp is a small lake located northwest of Lordville in Delaware County, New York. Blue Mill Stream flows into the lake from the north, it drains south-southwest via Blue Mill Stream, which flows into the Delaware River. Somerset Lake is located northeast of Black Ash Swamp.

See also
 List of lakes in New York

References 

Lakes of New York (state)
Lakes of Delaware County, New York